OC Transpo, officially the Ottawa-Carleton Regional Transit Commission, is the public transit agency for the city of Ottawa, Ontario, Canada. It operates an integrated hub-and-spoke system including light rail, bus rapid transit, conventional bus routes, and Para Transpo door-to-door accessible bus service.

OC Transpo's O-Train is a multimodal light rail system consisting of two lines: the east–west Confederation Line (Line 1), a  light rail system operating electric trains along a partially underground route that cuts through the downtown; and the north–south diesel-powered Trillium Line (Line 2), originally an  system from 2001 to 2020, which will be expanded to  upon the scheduled reopening in 2023. The Airport Link (Line 4), a  system sharing track with the Trillium Line but operating as a distinct segment, is also scheduled to open in 2023.

The agency's bus system has 170 routes and 43 bus rapid transit (BRT) stations on Ottawa's Transitway. The downtown core of the neighbouring city of Gatineau, Quebec is served by seven routes, most which operate only during peak periods on weekdays. Rush-hour service is provided to a park and ride lot in the Township of Russell.

History

Early history 

Ottawa's first public transportation system began in 1886 with the operation of a horsecar system.  The horse-drawn streetcars travelled back and forth from New Edinburgh to the Chaudière Bridge. The horsecar would remain a staple means of public transportation until 1891 after Thomas Ahearn founded the Ottawa Electric Railway Company. This private enterprise eventually provided heated streetcar service covering the downtown core. Electricity had been employed in a few places in Ottawa since the first demonstration of the incandescent bulb in 1883 (the earliest were Parliament Hill and LeBreton Flats). In May 1885, electric lighting commenced in the city.  In 1885 council contracted Ottawa Electric Light Company to install 165 arc lamps on the city's streets.

1970s: Formation, early Transitway and first strike 
Transit in Ottawa was provided by the Ottawa Transportation Commission until 1973 when transit service in the city and its suburbs was transferred under the auspices of the Regional Municipality of Ottawa-Carleton. Its formal name was the Ottawa-Carleton Regional Transit Commission, but the service was promoted in both English and French under the OC Transpo name, whose OC initials are derived from Ottawa-Carleton.

The 20-day 1979 strike was fought over a wage difference of a nickel and became known as "the five-cent bus strike".  A pay increase of 16.5% was rejected by the union.

1980s: Transitway 

In the early 1980s, OC Transpo began planning for a bus rapid transit system, the Transitway. Construction of its various stations and segments followed over many years. The first segments were from Baseline to Lincoln Fields in the west end and from Lees to Hurdman (two immediate stations) in the east end.

1990s: Second strike and shooting 

The second strike for OC Transpo ran from November 25 to December 16, 1996.  The strike ended under arbitration.

On Tuesday, April 6, 1999, former OC Transpo employee Pierre Lebrun, armed with a .30-06 Remington Model 760 pump-action rifle, shot six people, killing four, in a shooting spree at OC Transpo's St. Laurent Boulevard garage, before killing himself. Lebrun was fired in August 1997 but later reinstated, and quit in 1998.

An inquest into the shooting revealed Lebrun was the subject of teasing for his speech impediment, and that his complaints to management were not investigated. The inquest revealed an "atmosphere of bullying", described as a "poisoned" environment by an employment equity manager. In response, OC Transpo instigated zero-tolerance policies regarding workplace harassment, a new employee-management communications program, and increased training on workplace respect. However, studies in 2003 and 2004 found there to be lingering elements of a negative work environment, and employee-management communication was reported to be strained following the 1996 strike.

2000s: Trillium Line, expansions and third strike 
OC Transpo launched the O-Train diesel light rail transit (DLRT) service on October 15, 2001, as a pilot project. The service consists of one north–south line, with major points of interest including Carleton University and the South Keys Shopping Centre. In late 2014, this line became known as Trillium Line, or O-Train Line 2, to allow for expansion of the O-Train brand.

The province of Ontario ordered the amalgamation of the Regional Municipality of Ottawa-Carleton and its component municipalities into a single City of Ottawa municipality. When the new local governance took effect in 2001, OC Transpo became a department of the new city.

Following amalgamation, a bilingual replacement backronym for "OC" was sought, but no suitable candidates have been found. The anachronistic acronym has been kept, instead of the costly task of replacing the decals on all buses, bus stops, bus stations, and promotional material. Thus, "OC" is an orphan initialism.

A new section of the southwest Transitway opened on December 12, 2005, between the Nepean Sportsplex and Fallowfield Station. The new section runs parallel to Woodroffe Avenue and was built at a cost of $10 million. The new section has no stations and has replaced service along Woodroffe Avenue between the Nepean Sportsplex and Fallowfield. The Transitway was further expanded south into Barrhaven with Strandherd opened on January 2, 2007. There are also long range plans for other extensions in the Orleans and Kanata areas to keep up with more growing communities.

Following the 2006 municipal election campaign, Larry O'Brien was elected as mayor and cancelled the light rail expansion project, per a campaign promise. City Council decided to annul the project by a margin of 13–11 on December 14, 2006. The proposed northbound expansions from Bayview onward were later revived with the Confederation Line project, contracted in December 2012.

OC Transpo drivers, dispatchers, and maintenance workers under Amalgamated Transit Union local 279 went on strike December 10, 2008, at 12:01am. The main causes of the strike were disagreements between the City of Ottawa and the union regarding scheduling, payroll and seniority. Rona Ambrose, the Federal Minister of Labour ordered a union membership vote on January 8, 2009, on the city's contract proposal in response to a request from mayor Larry O'Brien. Both the city and the union published their positions on respective websites. Vote results released on January 9, 2009, revealed that of those eligible to vote, 64% rejected the offer.

Meetings were held with a mediator throughout the month, but talks were repeatedly broken off. The ATU had requested to send all issues not related to scheduling to arbitration, which the city refused as it requested all issues to be sent to an arbitrator. As the strike entered the 50th day, Ambrose, who had initially refused to table back-to-work legislation, announced that such legislation would be introduced.  However, on January 29, the city and the ATU reached a deal that sent every issue to binding arbitration, thus ending the 51-day-long strike.  On February 2, 2009, the O-Train Trillium Line started service after being out of service due to the strike.  Buses followed the following Monday, February 9, 2009.  Not all buses returned at once and OC Transpo said that all buses and routes were due to return by April 6, 2009. OC Transpo offered free transit for a week. December pass holders could either use their December passes until March or could get a refund. December pass holders were also subject to a 60% discount on March passes in order to win back transit users.

2010s: Confederation Line and bus collisions 

In December 2012, Ottawa City Council approved a major infrastructure project to build a 12.5 km east–west LRT line, the Confederation Line through the downtown to replace the existing BRT by 2019.

On September 18, 2013, a double-decker OC Transpo bus (#8017), running on Route 76 from Barrhaven to downtown at 8:48 a.m., collided with a Toronto-bound Via Rail passenger train at a level crossing, equipped with active warning systems, near Fallowfield Station in Ottawa's southwest end. Six people on the bus (including the driver) were killed and at least 30 others were injured, of which at least eight were critically injured. There were no injuries or fatalities to passengers or crew of the train. The cause of the accident is unknown at this time. It was announced the following year that Route 76 would be retired and changed to route 72 in recognition of those who died in the accident.
Incidentally, this route was spotted under a crossing gate at the Barrhaven Crossing Plaza on November 6, 2014; although no accident occurred, it sparked a lot of fear and questions in Barrhaven on whether these crossings are safe.

On January 11, 2019, another accident involving a double decker occurred, this time at Westboro station. The bus, operating Route 269, collided with the station's shelter shearing off part of the roof. Three people were killed (initially reported as two passengers, and one bystander from the platform. Later corrected to all three deaths were passengers) and 23 people were injured.

After several delays, the Confederation Line opened to the public on September 14, 2019. This line is also marketed as O-Train Line 1.

2020s: O-Train maintenance and COVID-19 intervention 
The Confederation Line (O-Train Line 1) continued to suffer from reliability issues throughout the first quarter of 2020. This is in contrast to the Trillium Line, which has a lower ridership and different technology, but generally good reliability. In response to this, and due to lower ridership in 2020, OC Transpo has scheduled several temporary closures of Line 1, allowing Rideau Transit Maintenance to work on the line and improve its reliability. During maintenance, the R1 bus route replaces train service.

On March 16, 2020, as a preventative measure against the COVID-19 pandemic (Coronavirus), OC Transpo began limiting front door boarding and seating to riders with accessibility needs. All other customers must board at the back of the bus. As a result, cash fares are neither accepted nor enforced on buses, but a valid fare is required to begin a trip at an O-Train station. On March 19, due to lower ridership and in consideration of train operators, a small number of seats on Confederation Line vehicles became unavailable to the public. Hand sanitizer was installed on all Line 1 stations, including the Bayview interchange, and thereafter installed on most Transitway station. Since June 15, 2020, the agency is requiring employees to wear a cloth mask or disposable mask, and it is requesting riders to do likewise.

On May 3, 2020, the Trillium Line (O-Train Line 2) was shut down for construction and expansion. Line 2 bus replacement service is provided by Route 2 from Bayview to South Keys.

On August 8, 2021, an empty train on the Confederation Line (O-Train Line 1) derailed while switching tracks after leaving Tunney's Pasture after one of the ten axles derailed. There were no injuries.

On September 19, 2021, a train with passengers on the Confederation Line (O-Train Line 1) derailed before entering Tremblay Station after 2 axles became dislodged from the second car. After leaving Tremblay Station in a derailed state, the train increased speed to about 35 km/h, crossed a bridge over Riverside Drive, struck a signal mast and switch heater and finally came to a stop between Tremblay Station and Hurdman Station using train-initiated emergency braking. There were no injuries.

Features 
OC Transpo has a fleet of 944 buses that run on regular streets, all of which are fully accessible low-floor buses. OC Transpo uses many articulated buses to provide service. Some of the routes that run on the Transitway, including the city's most-used bus routes, are served almost exclusively by articulated buses (e.g., routes 57, 61, 62, and 75). Peak hour connexion routes are served primarily by Double Decker buses.

In 2001, a pilot diesel-powered light rail service project, the original O-Train known today as the Trillium Line, was introduced. The local government announced expansion plans for the light rail to other parts of Ottawa, including a possible link to the Ottawa International Airport. Service to Gatineau would have also been possible, over the nearby Prince of Wales railway bridge over the Ottawa River. However, on December 14, 2006, City Council led by Mayor Larry O'Brien cancelled the north-south light rail expansion project. A new model of the project, to have a citywide integrated light rail system, was made, with work beginning in 2013 and will be completed in 2023. This new project envisions fully grade separated rapid transit service on the original Transitways from Baseline station or Moodie dr. in the west to Trim Park and Ride in the east. The gap between the east end west branches of Transitway will be replaced by a new downtown Subway tunnel under Queen and Rideau streets with three underground stations. The O-Train Trillium Line will be extended to Riverside South and will include a spur to the Ottawa Macdonald–Cartier International Airport, thus creating direct airport to downtown service. As for the suburbs, they will be served by 65 km of new Transitways. The first phase of the project, called the Confederation Line includes 12.5 km of rail between Tunney's Pasture and Blair, including the downtown subway.

For a number of years, OC Transpo has carried bicycle racks on some routes as a part of the "Rack & Roll" campaign. These racks carry up to two bicycles at the front of the bus and fold up against the bus when not in use. As of 2021, all buses in the fleet are equipped with bike racks. Traditionally, the racks have been available only between April and October, and there has been much debate over continuing the program throughout the year. However, cyclists may use the racks at any time of day, provided there is room for the cyclist on board the bus. Bicycles can be brought on board O-Train at all times of the year.

There are four bus depots located throughout the city. The largest and headquarters is located at 1500 St. Laurent Boulevard, with two other smaller but frequently used depots being located at 168 Colonnade Road (Merivale Garage) and the other on Queensview Drive (Pinecrest Garage). A major new maintenance depot which opened its doors in 2010 is located on Industrial Avenue.

Routes 

OC Transpo has 170 bus routes (as of October 6, 2019) that are grouped both by their number and the colour with which they are represented on system maps and on bus stop flags.

Fleet 

In 2006 and 2007, OC Transpo evaluated a double-decker bus on the Transitway and express routes. This bus, an Alexander Dennis Enviro500, can carry nearly 100 passengers. The initial service demonstration ran from June 28 to July 12, 2006, with a further demonstration under winter conditions in February 2007. The City of Ottawa purchased three Alexander Dennis Enviro500 buses and they were delivered in November 2008.  OC Transpo decals were added to the buses in December, but the strike delayed the introduction of these buses. The buses started service in February.

In August 2010, OC Transpo took advantage of an offer by New Flyer Industries, replacing 226 of its older underpowered 60-foot D60LF articulated buses (purchased between 2001 and 2004) with brand new D60LFR models. The bus exchange was completed in March 2011.  OC Transpo also received other incentives as part of the deal, including rebates on the trading-in of the old buses and a credit on new parts. Eighty new D60LFR articulated buses were also purchased from New Flyer, bringing the combined total to 306 buses. All of the 2001–2004 D60LFs are now retired. Some of the older New Flyer D60LF sixty-foot articulated buses have caught on fire during the summer of 2006 and the Summer/Fall of 2010, due to overheating engines, effectively putting them out of service.

OC Transpo purchased 75 more Alexander Dennis Enviro500 triple-axle double-decker buses in 2012, to replace older 40-foot models purchased from 1997 to 1999. These extra double-decker buses are used mainly on connexion routes. Double-decker buses use about the same amount of fuel as an articulated 60-foot bus, but only take up the same road area as a regular 40 foot bus, meaning they free up space (especially downtown), and provide increased seated passenger capacity for longer connexion bus routes, lowering OC Transpo's operating costs. As a result of the purchase, the 60-foot articulated buses were being moved from connexion routes to Transitway and other mainline routes, replacing the 40-foot models currently used on some trips by those routes. Those 40-foot models will replace the older 40-foot models currently used on local routes. The older 40-foot buses were retired from service. This plan was approved by the Transit Commission on April 20, 2011. The extra 75 Alexander Dennis E500 double-decker buses entered service between fall 2012 and spring 2013.

The maintenance of the fleet was complicated by adding buses from another manufacturer (OC Transpo already had buses from New Flyer and Orion before purchasing the double-deckers from Alexander Dennis). In cold and wet weather, condensation is prone to collecting on the roof of the upper deck, dripping on passengers below.

On July 12, 2011, OC Transpo announced that all remaining high floor buses were retired and thus all OC Transpo buses now have low floors, can be further lowered for strollers and walkers, and have flip-out ramps for wheelchairs. The full fleet is air-conditioned for Ottawa's short hot and humid summers.

The first few double-decker buses arrived in Ottawa on August 23, 2012.  The following day Ottawa mayor Jim Watson and transit chair Diane Deans introduced the first of the 75 double-decker buses at a ceremony at Ottawa city hall. The new double-deckers started entering service in October 2012, and are used throughout the system, including on Connexion routes from Kanata, Barrhaven, and Orleans.

Two of the new double-decker buses were in service as of September 10, 2012, and were temporarily used on peak period routes 22 and 30 (serving Orleans). This lasted until a sinkhole on Regional Road 174 was fixed in mid-September.

Bus fleet 
, OC Transpo has a fleet consisting of 937 buses, made up of 7 bus models:

Electric buses 

OC Transpo has purchased 4 electric New Flyer XE40 buses, which were delivered in November 2021, and entered service in early 2022. On June 7, 2021, a plan was announced that, if approved, would see 450 electric buses purchased by 2027, and full fleet electrification by 2036.

Rail fleet

Expansion fleet 
OC Transpo currently has seven four-car DEMU Stadler FLIRT from Stadler Rail for use when the Stage 2 improvements of the Trillium Line are completed. When these trains are introduced, the Alstom LINT DMU trains will be used on the Airport spur, between South Keys and Airport stations.

An expansion fleet of 38 Alstom Citadis Spirit LRVs will also be built for the Stage 2 vehicle additional requirements for use on Line 1.

Garages 
OC Transpo currently have 5 bus garages and two rail yards that house the fleet, and are also where vehicle maintenance is carried out. The garages are as follows:

 St. Laurent Garage. Opened in 1959, capacity of 275 buses. OC Transpo headquarters are also located on property.
 St. Laurent North Garage. Opened in 1987 and has a capacity of 207 buses. Located adjacent to St. Laurent Garage.
 Industrial Garage. Opened in 2010 as a purpose-built garage for 167 double-decker and articulated buses.
 Pinecrest Garage. Opened 1976 and has a capacity of 193 buses. Located near Pinecrest Rd. and Highway 417.
 Merivale (Colonnade) Garage. Opened in 1978 and has a capacity of 215 buses. Located in Nepean between Merivale Rd. and Prince of Wales Dr. Formerly known as the Colonnade Garage, as it is located on Colonnade Rd. South.
 Walkley Yard. Houses the Trillium Line DMU fleet. Located in the CNR Walkley Yard, off of Albion Rd. North. Opened 2001.
 Belfast Yard. Constructed to house the Confederation Line LRV fleet. Complete in 2018. Located on Belfast Road, with the rail access in between Tremblay and St Laurent Stations.

Fares 
OC Transpo fares can be paid in cash or with a Presto card.  The latter method must be purchased in advance at various retail outlets, ticket machines or stations.

Transfers are printed for passengers upon boarding by the driver (cash only). Transfers are integrated in the Presto cards when using the e-wallet. Such transfers are valid:
 for 90 minutes when issued during weekdays or Saturday, from 6:30am to 6:00pm
 for 105 minutes when issued Sunday, or from either 2:45am to 6:30am or 6:00pm to 10:30pm during the rest of the week
 until 4:30am the same day when issued from midnight to 2:45am
 until 4:30am the following day when issued from 10:30pm to 11:59pm

1951–1986 
This table only lists the regular adult cash fares. It was, for example, possible in 1955 to purchase a packet of four tickets or "carfares" for 25¢, making the cost of each ride 6.25¢.

1996–present 

Fares as of January 1, 2018

These were the last fares to accept paper tickets.

DayPass and multi-day passes 

The monthly pass, introduced in 1976, offers the lowest price per day for unlimited rides on OC Transpo. Paper passes were discontinued by 2017, with Presto monthly passes being the sole option.

OC Transpo introduced the DayPass at $5 ($7.16 in 2017 dollars) per voucher or $6 ($8.60 in 2017 dollars) cash on July 1, 1998. By 2000, the cash price matched the $5 voucher price. The price for both increased to $6 ($7.64 in 2017 dollars) in 2003, and since then, DayPass fares were gradually increased to reach $10.25 in 2017. DayPass vouchers were no longer sold since July 1, 2009, leaving only cash and tickets on the bus as a method of payment.

The Family DayPass was launched concurrently with the DayPass. At launch, it was available on Sundays and statutory holidays, allowing up to two adults and youth (age 12 or older) to ride the bus with up to four children (age 11 or younger) at the same price of a DayPass. With the discontinuation of DayPass vouchers on July 1, 2009, the Family DayPass was also made available on Saturdays.

On January 1, 2018, OC Transpo launched multi-day passes (3, 5, or 7 days). This allows multiple days of DayPass service, up to a week, to be purchased in advanced at a lower cost. Multi-day passes cannot be used as a Family DayPass, cannot be loaded on a Presto card and are emitted as a paper transfer. Passes are activated immediately upon purchase.

Discontinued fares 
Express fares were premium peak period bus routes, treated as a second fare zone by OC Transpo. Express bus passes for adults and students, and regular senior bus passes, were also accepted. On January 1, 2017, the Express fare was discontinued, and Express routes were rebranded as Connexion routes. Since this change, the entire OC Transpo network is treated as a single fare zone. The agency also cited the Confederation Line (Line 1), which opened in September 2019, as a reason for discontinuing the Express fare.

Rural Express fares were introduced on six routes on July 2, 2002, as a third fare zone. The cash fare was $4.75 (equivalent to $6.48 in 2020 dollars), while the ticket fare was $3.40 (equivalent to $4.64 in 2020 dollars) by using four tickets. Rural Express bus passes for adults and students, and regular senior bus passes, were also accepted. The cash fare increased to $5 in 2006, and later to $5.25. On July 2, 2012, the Rural Express fare was discontinued, with all Rural Express routes being repurposed as Express routes. Para Transpo continues to operate a rural fare zone.

Other prices 

Tickets for the O-Train light rail line were initially sold for $2 each at ticket vending machines in 2002 ($2.60 in 2016 dollars) when paying cash, lower than the $2.50 bus cash fare but pricier than the $1.70 ($2.21 in 2016 dollars) ticket fare at the time. Train tickets can be exchanged for a bus transfer on board of an OC Transpo bus. O-Train ticket prices increased over time, but remained lower compared to bus cash fares until July 2013, when OC Transpo increased O-Train ticket prices from $2.85 to $3.40 to match the bus cash fare. This represents an increase of over 19% and happened after the Presto card launch completed. This card is accepted at O-Train stations for a lower train fare. Bus tickets and DayPass vouchers cannot be used on the O-Train. Bus transfers, however, are accepted.

Monthly and annual passes are also available for all route classes with cost differences for adults, students, and seniors. Passes require an OC Transpo photo ID card, which is available at extra cost. Additionally, Ecopasses (reduced-rate monthly passes) are available through participating employers in the city, providing applicable OC Transpo riders with single-card indefinite passes in exchange for a flat bi-weekly, semi-monthly or monthly payroll deduction.

In July 2008, fares were increased by 7.5% because of a shortage in funding for the City of Ottawa. This fare hike was supposed to be in effect until 2010 including a 6.5% hike in 2009. This meant Ottawa residents saw regular adult passes rise from $73 a month to $81 and adult express passes from $90 to $101 a month. However, cash fares remained the same.

On 18 January 2013, OC Transpo starting the final testing of its Presto Card deployment as part of the NEXT-ON program. Ten thousand customers were able to order a Presto Card online or pick one up at select OC Transpo transitway stations, activate it, and use it for OC Transpo's final testing of the loadable cards. As of January 2013, over 10,000 Presto cards have been distributed. A limited number of Presto cards were available at Baseline Station on 22 January 2013, and at Fallowfield Station on 24 January 2013. The final full release date for Presto in Ottawa was on 18 May 2013.  Cards can be either loaded with cash and used like tickets, or loaded with as a monthly pass, which unlike the photo pass, is usable by family and friends. As of 2017, yearly and monthly photo passes have been discontinued, as they are not accepted at the new fare gates being installed along the O-Train.

The Province is encouraging all Ontario transit systems to adopt Presto, and the OC Transpo installation has been complex, requiring installation of readers at the front doors of all buses and all doors of articulated and double-decker buses, as well as a computer with a Presto fare database on each bus. The database was originally refreshed every night with updates of the day's Presto fare purchases when the buses return to the garages; this required users to wait up to 24 hours before cash loaded onto their card accounts is recognized by the readers. In 2014, the readers were upgraded to refresh up to 6 times a day using cellular data. There are now new fare gates and ticket vending machines at all O-Train stations. Unlike the TTC and GO Transit facilities, OC Transpo did not launch full Presto ticket machines until November 2017, when all O-Train Line 2 stations except for Bayview featured a new fare gate system. The full machines allow riders to check and reload a card prior to boarding.

In January 2021, OC Transpo launched the Bikesecure program which allows secure bike parking spots at a select number of transit stations to be reserved for a monthly fee.

Para Transpo 
Para Transpo is an accessible paratransit service available to Ottawa patrons who find it extremely difficult or impossible to use the conventional OC Transpo routes. Service is provided directly to the residences of eligible users who book trip appointments with a call centre at least one day in advance. Para Transpo drivers will provide some assistance to passengers to board designated vehicle and to access building entrances.

Para Transpo operations were contracted to First Student Canada, previously operated by Laidlaw. On January 1, 2008, the City of Ottawa assumed complete control of this service.

The transit strike of 2008 did not interrupt Para Transpo service. However, Para Transpo service did encounter delays, facing the traffic increase due to the strike.

Advertising 
Advertising on OC Transpo buses is contracted to Pattison Outdoor Advertising. Advertising on bus shelters is contracted to Branded Cities.  There has also been local funding to advertise on local TV stations such as CTV and CTV Two.

Amalgamated Transit Union – Local 279 
The Amalgamated Transit Union, Local 279 is the OC Transpo employees' union consisting of over 1700 members consisting of bus operators as well as other staffing positions within the company, including mechanics located at various garage depots throughout the city.

See also 

 Transitway (Ottawa)
 O-Train
 Trillium Line
 Confederation Line
 Société de transport de l'Outaouais (STO) in Gatineau, Québec

Notes

Footnotes

References

External links 

 OC Transpo website
 Drawings and photos of Ottawa Transit buses
 Moving Ottawa – The Mayor of Ottawa's Task Force on Transportation
 CPTDB Wiki

 
Transit agencies in Ontario
Transport in Ottawa
Bus transport in Ottawa
Transport in Gatineau
1948 establishments in Ontario
1999 crimes in Canada